The 2019–20 Macedonian First League was the 28th season of the Macedonian First Football League, the highest football league of North Macedonia. It began on 11 August 2019 and was scheduled to be end in July 2020. Each team will play the other sides four times on home-away basis, for a total of 36 matches. Shkëndija are the defending champions, having won their third title in 2018–19.

On 4 June 2020, the Football Federation of North Macedonia announced that the competition was abandoned due to the increasing number of COVID-19 cases in North Macedonia. Vardar was awarded the title, but no teams were relegated. The teams playing in Europe will be decided once the teams which successfully obtain a UEFA licence are known.

Promotion and relegation

Participating teams

Personnel and kits

Note: Flags indicate national team as has been defined under FIFA eligibility rules. Players may hold more than one non-FIFA nationality.

League table

Results

Matches 1–18

Matches 19–23

Positions by round
The table lists the positions of teams after each week of matches. In order to preserve chronological evolvements, any postponed matches are not included to the round at which they were originally scheduled, but added to the full round they were played immediately afterwards.

Season statistics

Top scorers

See also
2019–20 Macedonian Football Cup
2019–20 Macedonian Second Football League

References

External links
Football Federation of Macedonia 
MacedonianFootball.com 

North Macedonia
1
2019-20
North Macedonia